Ivan Lee Page (born April 7, 1969) is an American serial killer who strangled three women to death in Flint, Michigan between 1998 and 2001. Page was not considered a suspect in the murders until DNA technology exposed his involvement in 2007. Subsequently, he was convicted and sentenced to life imprisonment.

Murders 
On May 13, 1998, the body of 34-year-old Patricia "Tresa" Peeler was found dumped near Avenue A in Flint. Due to her being a prostitute, police initially suspected that Peeler had died from a cocaine overdose. However, when investigating the cause of death, Dr. Ljubisa Dragovic stated that Peeler was likely smothered to death. DNA from a male was recovered at the scene.

Over a year later, on October 8, 1999, the body of 31-year-old Lisa Marie Price was found. Price, a sex worker from Canton, Ohio, was found lying in a yard on Susan Street near W. Mott Avenue. An autopsy showed she had been strangled to death. According to police, after the discovery of Price they believed that it was linked to the murder of Peeler, and started speculating a serial killer. DNA was again located on her body.

On January 20, 2001, the body of 34-year-old Deena Brown, a mother of two, was found outside of Northridge Academy. Next to her body was a sweatshirt which, later on, was proven to have been the weapon used to strangle her to death. DNA was found on the sweatshirt.

Exposure 
In 2006, Page was arrested for simple drugs and weapons charges. While serving his sentence at a state prison camp, Page was required to submit a sample of his DNA so it could be entered into the FBI's Combined DNA Index System. In 2007, following the results, his DNA was matched to the DNA that was found on the three murdered women. Following this, he was charged with the murders.

After his arrest, Page's former cellmate, Jerome Currie, came forward and stated that Page often bragged about "choking hos" and "killing those hos". Around this time another man, Lee Plum, said that the night before Brown's body was found, he and Page took turns having sex with her when Page became upset and took Brown into a room for about 30 seconds, only to come out alone and mention something about the police.

Page went to trial for the murder of Deena Brown in 2008. His defense argued the DNA evidence did not prove that he killed her, but rather he had sex with her and someone else might have killed her. In December, he was found guilty, and the following January he was sentenced to life in prison.

Due to his current life term, and the possible risk of discrepancies in witnesses' statements if to try Page again, he will not be tried for the other two murders.

See also 
 List of serial killers in the United States

References 

1969 births
20th-century American criminals
21st-century American criminals
American male criminals
American rapists
American serial killers
Criminals from Michigan
Living people
Male serial killers
People from Flint, Michigan
Violence against women in the United States